Mónica Galán (October 16, 1950 – January 15, 2019) was an Argentine actress. She was a character actor seen on TV, Film and in the theatre.

Life 
Galán was born in 1950 in Buenos Aires. Galán graduated from the National School of Dramatic Arts and her first film appearance was in Daniel Tinayre's La Mary, starring Susana Giménez and Carlos Monzón in 1974. She went on to appear in other films such as Atrapadas  Blue Eyes, Murder in the Senate of the Nation, The side Dark of the Heart, Waiting for the Messiah and The Mural . Her last film was The Other Skin in 2018.

She had said in 1997 that she preferred to be a character actor rather than the star of films or TV dramas. Two years later she directed her first play which was No Be You , by Susana Torres Molina.

She appeared in the 2010 telenovela Malparida

She appeared as Vienna in the 1982 film Last Days of the Victim. That film was proposed but not nominated for Best Foreign Language Film at the List of submissions to the 55th Academy Awards for Best Foreign Language Film. Her role of Vienna was one of 17 where she was cast as a prostitute.

Galán died in Buenos Aires in 2019 having made 70 appearances in film or television.

Films include
 1974: La Mary
 1982: Últimos días de la víctima, as Vienna
 1984: Atrapadas
 1984: Asesinato en el Senado de la Nación, as Proxeneta
 1985: Los días de junio
 1992: Algunas mujeres (cortometraje)
 1992: El lado oscuro del corazón
 1992: ¿Dónde estás amor de mi vida que no te puedo encontrar?, as Chela
 1995: No te mueras sin decirme adónde vas, as Susana
 1997: El impostor, as Clotilde
 1997: Bajo bandera, as Paula
 1997: Pequeños milagros, as Susana
 1998: Sus ojos se cerraron y el mundo sigue andando, 
 2000: Lejanía
 2000: Esperando al mesías, as Voz de Elsa
 2000: Un amor de Borges
 2001: Cicatrices
 2001: Cabeza de tigre, as la Perichona
 2003: Nadar solo, as Lucía
 2004: Un mundo menos peor, as Isabel
 2008: Don't Look Down
 2010: Argentino Vargas, as Alicia
 2010: El mural, as Victoria Ocampo
 2018: La otra piel

References

External links

1950 births
2019 deaths
People from Buenos Aires
Argentine actresses